Kenny Hughes (born 13 September 1990) is a professional rugby league footballer who plays for the North Wales Crusaders in Betfred League 1. He plays as a hooker.

Hughes came through the St Helens academy and joined Oldham to play in the reserves in 2011.

Hughes previously played for Oldham in the Kingstone Press Championship and Betfred League 1.

References

External links
Oldham R.L.F.C. profile

Living people
1990 births
Oldham R.L.F.C. players
Rugby league hookers